The insider investment strategy is an investment strategy that follows the buying and selling decisions of so-called "insiders" in a stock market. The primary insiders have an advantage because they have access to more information about issues that could affect the current and future value of stock, which is known as an "information advantage." However, in the world there are only a few investment funds that follow the insider trades, both of them were established in 2011. 

In the United States, Catalyst Capital Advisors LLC  manages  Catalyst Insider Buying Fund. This fund is a large-cap, long-only equity fund that only invests in companies where corporate insiders are buying their own company's stock on the open market. In Europe, Dovre Forvaltning UAB  manages Dovre Inside Nordic fund.

Insider trading studies

A Lorie-Niederhoffer study indicates that proper and prompt analysis of data on insider trading can be profitable.

In 2014, Dovre Forvaltning shared his analysis on Insider Influence in the Nordic Region. The company analyzed these different yearly portfolios (both for Purchases and Sales):
 Had an insider Purchases in the past 1/3/6 months.
 Had only insider Purchases in the past 1/3/6 months.
 Last insider Transaction in the past 1/3/6 months was an insider Purchase.
 Had an insider Sales in the past 1/3/6 months.
 Had only insider Sales in the past 1/3/6 months.
 Last insider Transaction in the past 1/3/6 months was an insider Sale.

Only transactions above 80.000 SEK were included (33% of all insider trades were excluded because they were too small). If there were no Purchases/Sales in 1,3,6 months after a company's inclusion, it was excluded from the portfolio. All stocks are equally weighted. The analysis  showed that:

 Highest out performance is in Small Caps insider Purchase portfolios. Smaller in Mid Caps Purchase portfolios. And smallest in Large Caps insider Purchase portfolios.
 'Insider effect' fades away with longer holding horizon.
 Sell signals are stronger than Buy signals.
 Sell signals are the strongest when more than 50% of holdings are sold.
 Buy signals are the strongest when signal transaction value is <80.000 SEK.

References

Actuarial science
Investment management